John Gallucci Jr. is a physical therapist and athletic trainer. John was the President and Founder of JAG Physical Therapy and is currently the CEO of JAG-ONE Physical Therapy, a comprehensive orthopedic physical therapy company with locations throughout New Jersey and New York. He currently serves as the Medical Coordinator for Major League Soccer where he assists in the writing and executing of the league's medical policies and procedures for over 600 professional soccer players throughout 24 MLS cities.

John has appeared as a medical expert on ESPN's Outside the Lines, MSG Varsity, The Star-Ledger, and many other radio and television stations, newspapers, and magazines. His charitable efforts have included a leading role in fundraisers for Saint Barnabas Health Care System, The Valerie Fund, The LaConti Child Life Fund, the Leukemia & Lymphoma Society, and the American Cancer Society. He supports more than 30 high school and college teams and athletic clubs. He currently resides in Chatham, New Jersey.

Early life

Gallucci was born in Brooklyn, New York and attended the Monsignor Farrell High School where he was inducted into the school's Hall of Fame in 2010. He went on to study at Long Island University in Brooklyn, New York where he graduated with his master's degree in Sports Science and Athletic Training. John furthered his education at Dominican College in Orangeburg, New York where he completed his Masters and Doctorate in Physical Therapy. In 2018, John was named Dominican College's Person of the Year and was the first alumnus to receive this honor.

Career

After graduating from Long Island University, Gallucci accepted a position as an athletic trainer at New York University, where he spent five years. During his time at NYU, Gallucci developed a long-standing relationship with New York Knicks player Cal Ramsey. Through that relationship, he was offered a position working with the New York Knicks as a Medical Coordinator, where he was responsible for covering the franchise's summer youth programs under the supervision of New York Knicks Head Athletic Trainer Mike Saunders. He spent the next six years working for the franchise under the leadership of President Ernie Grunfeld and Vice President Ed Tapscott. During his time with the Knicks, Gallucci gained valuable experience in the world of NBA basketball, working with John Starks, Allan Houston, Anthony Mason, Greg Anthony, Herb Williams, and Anthony Bonner, and others.

Gallucci's experience in the National Basketball Association made him a shoo-in at Columbia University as an athletic trainer for their basketball program under current Los Angeles Clippers assistant Armond Hill, who at the time was head coach of the Ivy League school.

After leaving Columbia, Gallucci completed his Master's and Doctorate in Physical Therapy and began to serve as Head Athletic Trainer/Physical Therapist for many organizations including the New York Red Bulls, the Prudential Center, New Jersey Storm Lacrosse, New Jersey Pride Lacrosse, and New York Athletic Club Wrestling.

At the Red Bulls, he worked hand in hand with United States Men's National Soccer Team Coach Bob Bradley to keep players such as Tim Howard, Tab Ramos, Tony Meola, Michael Bradley, Clint Mathis, Daniel Hernandez and John Wolyniec on the field and at the top of their game. He assists with medical coordination at New Jersey's entertainment venue, Prudential Center, where he has overseen care of Britney Spears, the Spice Girls, The Black Eyed Peas, Katy Perry, Usher, Keith Urban, Taylor Swift, R. Kelly, and Cirque du Soleil, making him a resource for the Northeast Corridor as the "Rock Doc".

Along with his work in sports and entertainment, Gallucci has consulted on injury prevention for major corporations such as UPS, Continental Airlines, Delta, and Calandra Enterprises. He also stints as a Director at the Saint Barnabas Medical Center, currently known as Barnabas Health. Gallucci's experiences have led him around the world treating a variety of patients and athletes, as well as some of the United States' wealthiest people, sitting on the Forbes list of billionaires and the Forbes 400.

Gallucci currently serves as the Medical Coordinator of Major League Soccer, a professional soccer league based in the United States and sanctioned by the United States Soccer Federation (U.S. Soccer). The league comprises 24 teams, 21 in the U.S., and three in Canada. MLS represents the top tier of the American and Canadian soccer pyramids, featuring world-renowned superstars David Beckham, Landon Donovan, Thierry Henry, and Rafael Márquez. John's experience and knowledge assists in the writing and executing of the league's medical policies and procedures for over 600 professional athletes throughout the 24 MLS cities. He has also consulted with Soccer United Marketing and CONCACAF to coordinate medical care for venues all over the United States, Canada, and parts of South America. spelling assists in the organization of the MLS Medical Meeting and the MLS College Combine as well as coordinates the care for the MLS Championships and the league's All Star Game.

In 2014, John Gallucci Jr. wrote his first book, Soccer Injury Prevention and Treatment: A Guide to Optimal Performance for Players, Parents, and Coaches. The book is a comprehensive, illustrated guide to the best training, strengthening, stretching, nutrition, and hydration regimes to keep players safe and on the field. His second book, titled "Play Ball: Don’t Let Injuries Sideline You This Season" co-authored with the New York Yankees head team physician Dr. Christopher Ahmad was released on May 1, 2018.

Founding of JAG Physical Therapy

Gallucci's passion for treating and helping patients led him to build JAG Physical Therapy. 

JAG Physical Therapy offers athletic training services throughout the New York/Tri-state Area for a variety of major athletic clubs, schools, and organizations. Athletic trainers have been provided to the prestigious New York Athletic Club, NJSA, Parsippany Soccer Club, the Catholic High School Athletic Association, TSF Academy, Lifetime Fitness and PDA.

Press

He has been featured on ESPN's Award Winning " Outside the Lines " along with appearances on MSG Varsity, NY1, News 12 New Jersey, and the MLS Network to name a few. Gallucci currently serves as an expert on MedHelp. org's Physical Therapy forum and is a public speaker.

Charitable contributions

Gallucci has assisted in raising hundreds of thousands of dollars for a number of different charities and organizations. John is a supporter of The Valerie Fund, The Barnabas Foundation, The Matthew J. Morahan III Memorial Health Assessment Center for Athletes, the Leukemia & Lymphoma Society, The LaConti Child Life Fund, The ALS Association, The Janet Fund, and the American Cancer Society.

John, along with the entire JAG Physical Therapy staff, spearhead the Valerie Fund Walk & JAG Physical Therapy 5K Run to provide support for the comprehensive health care of children with cancer and blood disorders. The Valerie Fund Children's Centers comprise the largest network of healthcare facilities for children with cancer and blood disorders in New Jersey, and one of the largest in the nation. Since its inception, the walk has raised over 1.5 million dollars and continues to grow each year.

Soccer Injury Prevention and Treatment

Soccery Injury Prevention and Treatment: A Guide to Optimal Performance for Players, Parents, and Coaches is John Gallucci Jr.'s first book. Written by Gallucci, including a foreword by Tab Ramos former National Team/MLS player and Youth National Team Coach, the book is a guide for student athletes, weekend warriors, and professional players alike. The book includes several topics on how to prevent injuries which includes but not limited to: treating more than thirty common soccer injuries, identifying a concussion and knowing when it is safe to return to play, understanding and preventing injuries prevalent in young athletes, creating a nutrition plan for energy and strength, and building endurance, flexibility, and power while protecting your body from harm. The book has received positive reviews: Don Garber, Commissioner of Major League Soccer stated, "An important resource for soccer players of all ages and abilities," Tony Meola, US Soccer Hall of Fame goalkeeper said, "As a former athlete, coach, and a parent, this book is a must read!", and Larry Lemak, Medical Director of Major League Soccer said, "An excellent book! Gives readers a wealth of information about common soccer injuries and more importantly, proactive preventive measures." The book is currently available on both Amazon, and Barnes & Noble.

References

External links 
 JAG Physical Therapy website
 JAG Pediatric Therapy website

1967 births
Living people
People from Brooklyn
American sports coaches
Sports coaches from New York (state)